Sylvia Wynanda Seegrist (born July 31, 1960) is an American mass murderer who on October 30, 1985, opened fire at the Springfield Mall, a shopping mall in Springfield, Delaware County, Pennsylvania, a suburb of Philadelphia. Seegrist killed three people and wounded seven others before being disarmed by a man who was shopping at the mall. The individuals killed included two men and a two-year-old boy.

Seegrist was 25 years old and had been diagnosed with paranoid schizophrenia ten years earlier. Having been committed and discharged from mental care several times, her case stimulated discussion about the state's authority to commit at-risk people into mental care facilities versus individual rights.

Troubled past 
At Sylvia Seegrist's trial, her mother Ruth testified that her daughter's paternal grandfather fondled and exposed himself in front of Sylvia when she was 8 years old, and that Ruth had not learned about the sexual abuse until Sylvia was 13. When the two discussed the abuse, Seegrist reportedly told her mother that she didn't know "how intimate our relationship was."

Seegrist was first hospitalized at the age of sixteen, and was diagnosed with schizophrenia. She was hospitalized a dozen times and, upon each discharge, psychiatrists diagnosed that she no longer posed a risk to herself or others.

When she was of age, Seegrist attempted to enlist in the U.S. Army. As she was being inducted, she faced harassment from other members of her platoon, who assumed she was a lesbian; they set her up on a prank date and made her the butt of many jokes thereafter. Seegrist spent a good deal of time at the Springfield Mall, harassing customers and making statements about how "good" other spree killings were, such as the 1984 San Ysidro McDonald's massacre. She was discharged from the Army after two months because of her unusual behavior, which included sitting fully dressed in green fatigues at the spa and sauna of her fitness club. An instructor at the fitness club said "she hated everyone and would often talk about shooting and killing people".

Seegrist's behavior was so disconcerting that clerks at a local K-Mart told her they had no rifles in stock when she tried to purchase one from them. She eventually purchased a Ruger 10/22 at another store.

Shootings 

On the first of two trips to the Springfield Mall on the day of October 30, 1985, Seegrist shopped for Halloween items at a party store. She then worked out at a fitness club, before returning to the mall for the last time.

The man was not hit and having seen the vehicle she arrived in, flattened one of the Datsun's tires to prevent an escape in that vehicle. Meanwhile, Seegrist had approached the nearest entrance and fired at, but missed, a woman who was using a nearby ATM. Before entering the mall, she shot and killed two-year-old Recife Cosmen who was with his parents waiting to eat at a local restaurant.

Once inside, Seegrist fired into some stores and ignored others. Though many customers fled when they heard the gunfire, she came across (Ernest) Earl Trout, who either could not or did not hear it and was simply standing in front of a store where he became one of the three people killed that day. Augusto Ferrara was the last person killed in the rampage. John Laufer, a local graduate student, disarmed her as she walked up to him and tried to raise her gun to shoot him. Laufer forced her to a nearby store while he waited for the arrival of mall security. The first guard who responded asked her why she had just done what she did; her reply was "My family makes me nervous".

Trial 
Prior to the competency hearing Seegrist was transferred to Norristown State Hospital for evaluation. On March 6, 1986, Seegrist was deemed competent to stand trial for the killings.  Found guilty, but insane, she was sentenced to three consecutive life sentences (one for each victim she killed) and seven consecutive 10-year terms (one for each victim she wounded). The judge had said that Seegrist "should spend the rest of her life in some form of incarceration".  She was sent to the psychiatric specialty hospital Mayview State Hospital for evaluation and was eventually moved to the State Correctional Institution in Muncy, Pennsylvania.

Aftermath 
Seegrist's actions helped spur the state government to form a legislative task force, in order to address better ways to care for the mentally ill in the community. Seegrist's mother also urged legislators to make changes to the state mental health laws. The existence or nature of changes made by the task force is unknown.
In response to the 2012 Sandy Hook Elementary School shooting, Seegrist's mother Ruth told The Philly Post:

At the time of the shootings, gun buyers were required to sign a paper application declaring they had no record of being in a mental institution. Sylvia Seegrist lied on the application and purchased a .22 semi-automatic rifle for $107.00. In 1998, the state of Pennsylvania enacted the Pennsylvania Instant Check System or PICS, enabling licensed gun dealers to conduct a background check using a phone.

A reporter from The New York Times sent a letter to Seegrist, asking her to share her thoughts about what happened at the time of the shooting and about her life before she was arrested.  Here is an extract from her response:

Sylvia Seegrist served her first  years of imprisonment at Norristown State Hospital, and then transferred to Muncy State Prison for women.  Ruth Seegrist and her ex-husband visited Sylvia regularly at Muncy and she seemed to welcome the visits. But about 1992, Sylvia Seegrist had severe difficulties with her antipsychotic medication. Her mother is not sure what medication she is taking now, but around 1997, Sylvia made a decision to stop any contact with her family members.  Visits and phone calls ended, the last letter Ruth Seegrist sent to her daughter was on Nov. 30. Sylvia has not replied.

"It's her illness," said Ruth Seegrist, 67 (2002), "She's schizophrenic and psychotic and becomes extremely paranoid. She dwells on things in the past. Since I was her closest family member, I got blamed: She did what she did because of me!"  Seegrist's Muncy Prison counsellor meets her at least every two weeks.  Her counsellor notes that Sylvia takes her meds, spends time at the library, exercises a lot and takes steps to keep herself sharp.

Sylvia Seegrist's precursor to the shooting was due to her fear that her mother was trying hard to have her sent to a mental care facility again. She said that she would "rather die or go to prison than go to a mental hospital."
Ruth Seegrist said she had seen A Beautiful Mind, a 2001 biographical drama film about John Nash, a Princeton math professor and Nobel laureate who also was schizophrenic.  "I thought it was very well done." Seegrist said. "When a person is so delusional – at first he thought it all was real, but it really was in his mind."
Ruth Seegrist said, "I really believe she belongs in the forensic unit of a hospital, not in prison." She also shared, "They should be incarcerated in the forensic unit of a hospital ... until they get functional and stabilized.

References

Further reading 

Kanaley, Reid.  "Her Demons Stilled, Seegrist Hopes for Freedom," The Philadelphia Inquirer, March 18, 1991.
Kelleher, Michael D.  Flash Point: The American Mass Murder.  Westport, Connecticut: Praeger, 1997.
Lane, Brian and Wilfred Gregg.  The Encyclopedia of Mass Murder.  New York: Carroll and Graf, 2004.
Lee, Janis.  "Confidentiality from the Stacks to the Witness Stand," American Libraries 19; June 1998.
Young, Cathy.  "When Delusions Beget Violence," Center Right, Issue 29, September 21, 1998.
Walker, Julien.  "Helping to Cope with Mental Illness at Friends Hospital," Northeast Times 2001.

External links 
 Investigation Discovery – Deadly Women | Twisted Minds; Sylvia Seegrist
 CBS – 60 Minutes | "Wouldn't Anybody Listen"

1960 births
1985 mass shootings in the United States
1985 murders in the United States
American female murderers
American people convicted of murder
American prisoners sentenced to life imprisonment
Living people
American spree killers
People convicted of murder by Pennsylvania
People with schizophrenia
Place of birth missing (living people)
Prisoners sentenced to life imprisonment by Pennsylvania
Attacks on shopping malls
Mass shootings in Pennsylvania